Pullinger may refer to:

 Amanda Pullinger (born 1966), chief executive
 Dorothée Pullinger (1894–1986), automobile engineer 
 George Pullinger (1920–1982), cricketer
 Herbert Pullinger (1878–1961), illustrator
 Jackie Pullinger (born 1944), missionary 
 Jan Pullinger (born 1947), politician
 John Pullinger (born 1959), statistician
 Kate Pullinger, novelist
 Thomas Pullinger (1867–1945), automobile engineer

See also
 Beardmore Halford Pullinger, manufacturer
 Pullinger Kop, park
 Pullingers, chain of stores